Oakville is a city in Grays Harbor County, Washington, United States. It was incorporated in 1905, with booming lumber, railway, and farming industries creating the early foundation of the community. The population was 715 at the 2020 census.

History
In 1818, the United States and Great Britain agreed to a treaty of joint occupancy in the Oregon Country, which included the land that would eventually become Oakville, Washington. Over the next several decades, citizens of the United States began to settle in the area. As traveling by boat was easier than moving through the dense forests, many used the river system, entering from the port of Grays Harbor and canoeing inland via the Chehalis River. The British government gave full ownership of the area to the United States in 1846.

In 1850, the land now occupied by Oakville was mainly open prairie, maintained by yearly fires started deliberately by local tribes, which kept the forest from encroaching and which encouraged the bloom of camas, a staple food, and other plants. This open land was attractive to settlers arriving in the area. The native people of the area were very helpful to the settlers, and towns began to be platted up and down the Chehalis River. In the 1870s, a party of several families relocated to the area from Crawford County, Illinois. The leader of the party, James Reed Harris, had purchased the donation claim for the area from John Hole for $1200. He applied for a post office, and after some discussion, it was decided to use the name "Oakville," inspired by the Garry oak trees in the area; the post office opened on December 31, 1873. Logging and railroad construction soon brought other settlers to the area; the plat of the city site was filed on September 27, 1887. Around 1890, Northern Pacific Railway was laying tracks through the city. By the turn of the century, a Northern Pacific train station had been established in the city, and the area had several general stores, a new school, and a couple of hotels. Oakville was officially incorporated on December 18, 1905.

In 1909, a report by the Railroad Commission of Washington described Oakville:
"Oakville is a town of about 400 inhabitants, located on the line of the Northern Pacific trailer in the center of an important lumbering and taking district. The timber resources of this section are of immense value and the bottom lands are well adapted to general farming. Oakville is a growing town and will develop more rapidly as the resources of the surrounding district are more thoroughly exploited."

Lumber was a major industry in the early days of the city; in 1916, Oakville Lumber Company, Big Fir Lumber Company, Vance Lumber Company, and others were in operation, along with the Callow Mill. The city was "noted for large shipments of cascara bark." Factories were also part of the city's economy, with the E.H. Hilton & Co. Oiled Clothes Factory in operation by 1915, and the Oakville Co-Operative Cheese Company incorporating a few years later. Other businesses in the early days of the city included a jewelry store, a shoe company, and a hardware store. The city's librarian Clara Trudgeon had been appointed by the State Traveling Library by 1908, making Oakville eligible to be a recipient of one of the 150 cases of books the state had in rotation. The weekly newspaper was The Oakville Cruiser. By 1919, the city had an active community center, and the high school had received accreditation as a four-year school.

The historic bank was incorporated on August 14, 1909 by C.R. Harper and C.C. Scates; first called the Oakville State Bank, it changed names and ownership several times over the next century. It is said to be the last bank in Washington to be robbed by a rider on horseback. The city has commemorated this throughout the years by hosting reenactments of the robbery, with groups competing to give the best performance.

Oakville blobs

On August 7, 1994, a resident reported that a translucent, gelatinous substance had rained down in the night; she expressed concern that it may have caused her and her mother to become ill, and speculated it may have been the reason her kitten died. When the substance, colloquially known as "Oakville blobs," appeared again, samples were collected and tested by a local doctor, who initially stated that the substance contained human blood cells. Further testing by the Department of Ecology refuted these results, as tests showed that there were no nuclei present. Several theories were given by residents, including wondering whether the substance might have been waste from a commercial plane toilet or whether it may have been particles of deceased jellyfish that had evaporated and been incorporated into a rain cloud. The blobs were also found to contain two species of bacteria. No theory was ever proven to be correct, but for a time, the incident received coverage in several media outlets, including The New York Times, and a segment was produced about it for an episode of Unsolved Mysteries and Monsters and Mysteries in America.

Geography

Oakville is on the northern shore of the Chehalis River, just downstream from the convergence of the Chehalis and Black Rivers.  This is an area subject to annual flooding, with major floods occurring most recently in 2007 and 1996.  Both of these floods were federally declared disasters due to the extensive damage to human life, livestock, and property in the region. In 2016, the Chehalis River Basin Flood Authority authorized $55,000 to be used to collect data, geography, and history on the flooding in the city, which reports indicated to be affecting approximately 35 homes and causing on average three road closures per event, with this flooding occurring typically twice a year.

To its north, Oakville is bordered by the hills of the Capitol State Forest. The area is filled with hills, valleys, rivers, and dense forests.

Climate
According to the Köppen Climate Classification system, Oakville has a warm-summer Mediterranean climate, abbreviated "Csb" on climate maps.

Demographics

2010 census
As of the census of 2010, there were 684 people, 260 households, and 176 families residing in the city. The racial makeup of the city was 86.5% White, 0.6% African American, 5.1% Native American, 0.9% Asian, 0.1% Pacific Islander, 4.1% from other races, and 2.6% from two or more races. Hispanic or Latino of any race were 6.6% of the population.

There were 260 households, of which 36.9% had children under the age of 18 living with them, 46.2% were married couples living together, 13.5% had a female householder with no husband present, 8.1% had a male householder with no wife present, and 32.3% were non-families. 22.3% of all households were made up of individuals, and 7.7% had someone living alone who was 65 years of age or older. The average household size was 2.63 and the average family size was 3.08.

The median age in the city was 37.1 years. 26% of residents were under the age of 18; 7.2% were between the ages of 18 and 24; 27% were from 25 to 44; 25.7% were from 45 to 64; and 14% were 65 years of age or older. The gender makeup of the city was 49.1% male and 50.9% female.

2000 census

As of the census of 2000, there were 675 people, 233 households, and 170 families residing in the city. The population density was 1,407.3 people per square mile (543.0/km2). There were 260 housing units at an average density of 542.1 per square mile (209.1/km2). The racial makeup of the city was 81.04% White, 1.19% African American, 7.11% Native American, 0.59% Asian, 0.15% Pacific Islander, 3.41% from other races, and 6.52% from two or more races. Hispanic or Latino of any race were 7.41% of the population. 18.6% were of German, 6.8% American, 6.6% Norwegian, 5.6% Irish and 5.1% European ancestry.

There were 233 households, out of which 42.9% had children under the age of 18 living with them, 50.6% were married couples living together, 14.6% had a female householder with no husband present, and 27.0% were non-families. 21.9% of all households were made up of individuals, and 9.0% had someone living alone who was 65 years of age or older. The average household size was 2.90 and the average family size was 3.35.

In the city, the population was spread out, with 34.4% under the age of 18, 6.8% from 18 to 24, 27.4% from 25 to 44, 20.9% from 45 to 64, and 10.5% who were 65 years of age or older. The median age was 32 years. For every 100 females, there were 96.8 males. For every 100 females age 18 and over, there were 92.6 males.

The median income for a household in the city was $30,357, and the median income for a family was $32,500. Males had a median income of $32,431 versus $23,214 for females. The per capita income for the city was $13,428. About 17.5% of families and 18.6% of the population were below the poverty line, including 25.7% of those under age 18 and 23.1% of those age 65 or over.

Economy

In the first few decades of Oakville, the area had a booming trade in lumber, with logging and mills providing a flourishing foundation to the economy, and with many other businesses springing up to sell to the workers these trades brought in. As the timber industry faded, many of the other businesses shut down as well.

As of 2018, Oakville's main businesses included a small grocery store, a few diners, an organic bedding manufacturer, an auction house, and a chip plant, as well as some farms on the outskirts of the city. Oakville also has a chamber of commerce.

Arts and culture
The city has several annual events. In July, it hosts an Independence Day parade, temporarily closing a stretch of U.S. Highway 12. Later in the summer, it is home to the Zucchini Jubilee. Other local traditions have included a tree lighting and an egg hunt. The city also regularly hosts a Saint Patrick's Day dinner, a harvest festival, and a spaghetti dinner.

The city is served by Timberland Regional Library. The library shares a building with city hall.

Oakville is bordered on the east by the Confederated Tribes of the Chehalis Reservation. The tribe offers many services to its members in the community, helping to maintain the cultural heritage of the area.

Parks and recreation
The city has a playground, a picnic shelter, and a basketball court located at Al Brandt Municipal Park, across from city hall. The area surrounding the city is host to a variety of outdoor activities, with boating, fishing, and swimming taking place in the Chehalis and Black rivers to the south, and hiking, hunting, camping, horseback riding, and mountain biking in Capitol State Forest to the north.

The Oakville Regional Event Center hosts a variety of competitions, from rodeos to adventure races.

Government 
The city is governed by a mayor and a city council. The council meets twice a month.

The city also maintains a municipal court, a cemetery, water utility, and a fire department. In the fiscal years of 2013 and 2014, the City was operating on annual budgets of approximately $800,000.

The city regularly partners with the chamber of commerce to plan community events.

Education

Oakville School District No. 400 has one elementary school, one middle school, and one high school. It serves 241 students in Grays Harbor County in May 2018. The Board of Directors governs the operations of the district; this board has five members, who are elected to terms lasting four years. The day-to-day operations of the district are managed under the leadership of the superintendent, who is appointed by the school board. The district employs approximately thirty people in the roles of teachers and support staff. The district operates on a general fund budget of approximately $3.5 million.

The original Oakville elementary school, built in 1953, began to be demolished in November 2021 after a bond program to rebuild and renovate the school system campus was passed in 2020. The $5.6 million measure would cover the cost of a new elementary building and help to refurbish several areas at the high school. A separate, small schools modernization grant of $4.6 million covered additional upgrades on the campus.

Notable people
 Hazel Pete (March 21, 1914 – January 2, 2003), basket weaver from the Chehalis tribe
 Katherine Van Winkle Palmer (1895 – September 12, 1982), paleontologist
 Frank Hinman Waskey (April 20, 1875 – January 18, 1964), delegate from the District of Alaska

References

External links
City Homepage
School District Website

Cities in Washington (state)
Cities in Grays Harbor County, Washington